Arcila is a Spanish surname with significant usage in Colombia. Notable people with the surname include:
Andres Arcila (born 1994), Colombian footballer
Daniel Arcila (born 1993), Colombian footballer
Isabella Arcila (born 1994), Colombian swimmer	
Paula Arcila (born 1975), Colombian television personality

See also
Archila
Arcilla

Spanish-language surnames